Hema Singh is an Indian professor and actress.  Her first role was at the age of 11 in the soap opera Kyunki Saas Bhi Kabhi Bahu Thi.  She later attended the National School of Drama (NSD) in New Delhi.   After doing some freelance work as an actress, she became a professor at NSD.  One of her most prominent roles is that of Imarti Devi in the television series Kairi — Rishta Khatta Meetha.

References

Year of birth missing (living people)
Living people
Indian television actresses